Julien Airoldi (27 May 1900 – 3 December 1974) was a French politician.

Airoldi was born in Deluz.  He represented the French Communist Party in the Constituent Assembly elected in 1945, in the Constituent Assembly elected in 1946 and in the National Assembly from 1946 to 1951.

References

1900 births
1974 deaths
People from Doubs
Politicians from Bourgogne-Franche-Comté
French Communist Party politicians
Members of the Constituent Assembly of France (1945)
Members of the Constituent Assembly of France (1946)
Deputies of the 1st National Assembly of the French Fourth Republic